"Xenomigia" disciplaga is a moth of the family Notodontidae. It is found in Colombia.

Taxonomy
The species probably does not belong in Xenomigia, but has not been placed in another genus yet. The species is only known from the female type and is impossible to place in an existing Dioptinae genus.

References

Moths described in 1926
Notodontidae of South America